Pupovac is a Serbian surname, derived from the noun pup (bud). The surname refers to the wealthy medieval clan spreading out into a few family branches in the territory of Zadar County. It may refer to:

 Adrijana Pupovac, Serbian Politician
 Branka Pupovac, Australian Wheelchair Tennis Player
 Milorad Pupovac, Croatian-Serb Politician and Linguist
 Sergio Pupovac, French-Born Luxembourgian Footballer

Serbian surnames